is a National junior college in Niigata, Niigata, Japan.

History 
 1974, Junior College was set up.
 1999, Registration of student was ended in this year.
 2003, Junior College was discontinued.

Names of Academic department 
 Nursing studies
 technology studies
 Medical laboratory studies

Advanced course 
 Midwifery studies

See also 
 Niigata University

External links
  

Japanese junior colleges
Universities and colleges in Niigata Prefecture
Educational institutions established in 1974
Educational institutions disestablished in 2003